The Fighting Ranger is a 1925 American silent Western film serial directed by Jay Marchant and starring Jack Dougherty. The film is now considered to be lost.

Plot
As described in a review in a film magazine, fifteen years earlier, John Marshall (Welsh), a prosperous cattle raiser, shot a man. He knew the act was justifiable, but because of the political influence of his victim he felt his only recourse was to flee. Taking his little daughter, he hid himself in a fastness of the mountains that constitute a part of his vast ranch. The only man he trusts in the outside world is Topaz Taggart (Osborne), a political boss and all-round tricky citizen, who is really trying to get Marshall's ranch as he knows that buried on it is a fabulous treasure that is guarded by an aged Yaqui, the last of his tribe. Bud Hughes (Wilson), one time an aviator but now a tramp, has attached himself to Marshall's hiding place which also includes Miguel Cordero (Avery), a faithful Mexican workman. One day Terrence O'Rourke (Dougherty), a forest ranger with a double mission, drops into the hiding place because, due to a wound, he lost control of his airplane. Marshall's daughter Mary (Sedgwick), now grown into womanhood, nurses the young man back to health. From here, in later chapters Terrence becomes her and her father's protector in a series of disheartening experiences at the hands of Taggart and his tools.

Cast

Chapter titles

 The Intruder
 The Frame-Up
 The Secret Trail
 Falsely Accused
 The Betrayal
 The Lost Fortune
 Cattle Wolves
 Under Fire
 Man to Man
 The Fatal Message
 Hidden Fangs
 False Friends
 Stolen Secrets
 Steeds of the Sky
 Yaqui Gold
 Left for Dead
 Yaqui Gold
 [Unknown title]

See also
 List of American films of 1925
 List of film serials
 List of film serials by studio
 List of lost films

References

External links

 

1925 films
1925 lost films
1925 Western (genre) films
American silent serial films
American black-and-white films
Films directed by Jay Marchant
Lost Western (genre) films
Lost American films
Universal Pictures film serials
Silent American Western (genre) films
1920s American films